"It's Your Misfortune and None of My Own" is also a Western novel by Stephen Bly.

"It's Your Misfortune and None of My Own": A New History of the American West is a history of the American West. The book's title comes from the lyrics to the traditional cowboy ballad Git Along Little Dogies. The 684 page history was written by Richard White and first published by the University of Oklahoma Press in 1991. It covers the history of the West from the Spanish conquest in the 16th century to the presidency of Ronald Reagan.

The book is a notable example of an approach sometimes called the "New Western History", which tells the story of the American West as the history of all the people in the region rather than the story of the expanding frontier of the United States.  White's departure from the traditional interpretation of the American West—embodied in Frederick Jackson Turner's influential Frontier Thesis—is reflected in the fact that White never uses the word "frontier" in his book.

The book received the National Cowboy & Western Heritage Museum's Western Heritage Award for non-fiction books in 1992.

Editions
Norman: University of Oklahoma Press, 1991.  
Norman: University of Oklahoma Press (paperback reprint edition), 1993.

References

External links
"It's Your Misfortune and None of My Own"; University of Oklahoma Press
Google Books Preview

1991 non-fiction books
History books about the American Old West
University of Oklahoma Press books